The 2020–21 Indian Super League playoffs was seventh playoffs series in the Indian Super League, one of the top Indian professional football leagues. The playoffs began on 5 March 2021 and concluded with the final on 13 March 2021 in Goa.

The top four teams from the 2020–21 ISL regular season had qualified for the playoffs. The semi-finals took place over two legs while the final was a one-off match at the Fatorda Stadium in Margao, Goa

Season table

Teams
 Mumbai City
 ATK Mohun Bagan
 Northeast United
 Goa

Bracket

Semi-finals

Semi-finals

 2–2 on aggregate. Mumbai City won 6–5 on penalties.

 ATK Mohun Bagan won 3–2 on aggregate.

Final

References

2020–21 Indian Super League season